Radio Corporación (Pichilemu) is a radio station located in Pichilemu.

External links 

 Radio Corporación (Pichilemu)

Radio stations in Chile
Mass media in Pichilemu
Organizations based in Pichilemu
Organizations established in 2007
2007 establishments in Chile